Richard Mulligan (November 13, 1932 – September 26, 2000) was an American character actor known for his roles in the sitcoms Soap (1977–1981) and Empty Nest (1988–1995). Mulligan was the winner of two Emmy Awards (1980 and 1989) and one Golden Globe Award (1989). Mulligan was the younger brother of film director Robert Mulligan.

Early life and career
Mulligan was born on November 13, 1932, in New York City. He served in the Navy in the early 1950s during the Korean War and later studied to become a playwright at Columbia University. After college, he began working in theatre, making his debut as a stage manager and performer on Broadway in All the Way Home in 1960. Additional theatre credits included A Thousand Clowns, Never Too Late, Hogan's Goat, and Thieves.

Mulligan made a brief, uncredited appearance in the 1963 film Love with the Proper Stranger, which was directed by his elder brother. He starred with Mariette Hartley in the 1966–67 season comedy series The Hero, in which he played TV star Sam Garrett. Garrett had starred in a fictional series as Jed Clayton, U.S. Marshal. The Hero lasted for 16 episodes. Another notable TV appearance was on the I Dream of Jeannie episode "Around the World in 80 Blinks", as a navy commander accompanying Major Nelson (Larry Hagman) on a mission.  He also appeared in the season-13 episode "Wonder" of the Western TV show Gunsmoke.

1970s to end of career
Mulligan's most notable film role was as General George Armstrong Custer in Little Big Man, whom he portrayed as a borderline psychotic. He also appeared in the disaster movie spoof, The Big Bus (1976), where he was reunited with Larry Hagman from I Dream of Jeannie, and in the 1966 film The Group, in which he played Dick Brown, Harold's (Hagman) New York artist friend. In 1975, he starred in a radio adaptation of Edgar Allan Poe's "The Oblong Box" heard on the CBS Radio Mystery Theater.

Mulligan's best-known roles in television were as Burt Campbell in the sitcom Soap (1977–81), for which he won a Best Actor Emmy Award, and as Dr. Harry Weston in the NBC series Empty Nest, a spin-off of The Golden Girls in which his character had appeared in a couple of episodes. Empty Nest ran for seven seasons, and Mulligan won a Best Actor Emmy Award as well as a Golden Globe Award for his performance. He also played  Secretary of State William Seward in Lincoln (1988), a TV movie based on Gore Vidal's novel.

Mulligan returned to perform on Broadway and in films, in which he usually played supporting roles. A notable exception was the black comedy S.O.B. (1981), in which he played a leading character, Felix Farmer, a Hollywood producer-director based upon the film's actual producer-director, Blake Edwards. The film starred Julie Andrews and William Holden, and also featured Larry Hagman. 
Mulligan was cast as Reggie Potter in the television series Reggie (1983). Lasting for only six episodes, it was a loose adaptation of the popular BBC series The Fall and Rise of Reginald Perrin. In the 1984 film Teachers, he played an eccentric high-school history teacher (who in one scene teaches the Battle of the Little Bighorn, once more dressed as General Custer).

In 1985, he guest-appeared The Twilight Zone episode "Night of the Meek", where he took on the role of Henry Corwin, an alcoholic department-store Santa Claus who becomes the genuine article, in the remake of the 1959 Christmas episode "The Night of the Meek", the character Art Carney had played in the original version. The next year, he appeared in another episode of the series, "The Toys of Caliban".

Mulligan lent his voice to Disney's 1988 animated film, Oliver & Company, as the oafish Great Dane named Einstein. His final performance was a voice-over on Hey Arnold! in 2000 as the voice of Jimmy Kafka, the long mentioned, but never seen former friend of Arnold's grandpa.

Marriages
Mulligan married four times. He was first married to Patricia Jones from 1955 to 1960, with whom he had a son, James. That was followed by marriages to Joan Hackett from January 3, 1966, to June 1973 and Lenore Stevens from 1978 to 1990. His last marriage was to adult film actress Rachel Ryan on April 27, 1992, which only lasted to early 1993.

Death
On September 26, 2000, Mulligan died of colorectal cancer at his home in Los Angeles. He was 67 years old. At his own request, his remains were cremated and there was no funeral service. Mulligan was survived by his son James Mulligan from his first marriage, and two brothers, Robert and James.

Recognition 
In 1989, Mulligan won both the Emmy Award and the Golden Globe Award for Best Lead Actor in a Comedy Series for portraying Dr. Harry Weston in Empty Nest (1988–1995). On September 30, 1993, he received a star on the Hollywood Walk of Fame for his work in the television industry, located at 6777 Hollywood Boulevard.

Filmography

Film

Television

References

External links
 
 
 

1932 births
2000 deaths
20th-century American male actors
American male film actors
American male stage actors
American male television actors
Best Musical or Comedy Actor Golden Globe (television) winners
Columbia University alumni
Deaths from cancer in California
Deaths from colorectal cancer
Male actors from New York City
Male actors from Los Angeles
Outstanding Performance by a Lead Actor in a Comedy Series Primetime Emmy Award winners
People from the Bronx